Yimkhiungrü, also Yachumi (Yatsumi) in Sümi, is a Sino-Tibetan language spoken in northeast India by the Yimkhiung Naga people. It is spoken between Namchik and Patkoi in Shamator District, eastern Nagaland, India. Yimkhiungrü language has more than 100,000 speakers and is used in over 100 villages and towns.

Dialects
Ethnologue lists the following dialects of Yimchungrü:
 Tikhir
 Wai
 Chirr
 Minir
 Phanungru
 Langa

References

Further reading 
Kumar, Braj Bihari. (1973). Hindi–Yimchungrü–English dictionary. Kohima, India: Nagaland Bhasha Parishad.
(2004). Where on earth do they speak Naga, Yimchungru? Retrieved from http://www.verbix.com/maps/language/NagaYimchungru.html

External links 
Yimchungrü Naga Profile at the Endangered Languages Project
Profile on Naga, Yimchungru

Ao languages
Languages of Nagaland
Endangered languages of India
Endangered Sino-Tibetan languages